Virginia Elena Carta (born 24 December 1996) is an Italian professional golfer who plays on the Ladies European Tour. In 2016, she received the Honda Sports Award after winning the NCAA Women's Championship.

Amateur career
Carta was born in Milan on Christmas Eve in 1996 and grew up in Udine, Italy, where she was introduced to golf by her mother at a young age. 

She became a member of the Italian National Team in 2010, and won the 2012 European Young Masters in a team with Renato Paratore. She won silver at the 2014 European Girls' Team Championship in Slovakia, and at the 2014 Summer Youth Olympics in Nanjing she finished T4 individually and won the mixed team bronze with Renato Paratore.

Carta was successful in tournaments across Europe and won the Austrian International Amateur, German Girls Open, Slovenian Amateur Championship, French International Lady Juniors Amateur Championship and the French International Ladies Amateur Championship. 

She played in both Annika Invitational Europe and Annika Invitational USA, and recruited Annika Sörenstam as her mentor.

In 2015, she accepted a golf scholarship to Duke University. As a freshman, she won the 2016 NCAA Women's Championship individually with an NCAA record score of 272 (−16), and won the 2016 Honda Sports Award as Player of the Year nationally. She fell to Seong Eun-jeong in the final of the 2016 U.S. Women's Amateur, 1 up. Invited to play the 2016 LPGA Marathon Classic she made the cut, but missed the cut in the 2017 U.S. Women's Open.

Carta battled injury during the 2016-17 and 2017-18 academic years, and won only the 2017 The Landfall Tradition, before winning the 2019 NCAA Women's Championship with the Duke Blue Devils women's golf team. She is one of only 20 golfers in NCAA history, male or female, to win both an NCAA Individual and team championship. 

After graduating from Duke in 2019, Carta made the unusual decision to defer qualifying for the LPGA Tour for a year, instead opting to do a Master's degree in Environmental Policy at Cambridge University, England. She planned to enter LPGA Q-School in 2020, which was cancelled due to the COVID-19 pandemic, leaving her without tour status.

Professional career
Carta turned professional in 2021 and received six invitations to events on the Ladies European Tour. She missed the cut at her first event as a professional, the Ladies Italian Open, but soon finished T5 at the VP Bank Swiss Ladies Open and T6 at the Lacoste Ladies Open de France. She finished T19 at LET Q-School in December to secure playing rights for the 2022 season.

In 2022, she held a two-stroke lead at the Santander Golf Tour Málaga ahead of the final day, but produced a final score of 72 to finish runner-up, one stroke behind Sára Kousková.

Amateur wins
2012 Citta di Milano Trofeo Gianni Albertini, Trofeo Umberto Agnelli
2013 Austrian International Amateur
2014 German Girls Open, Slovenian Amateur Championship, French International Lady Juniors Amateur Championship
2016 NCAA Women's Championship (individual)
2017 The Landfall Tradition
2018 French International Ladies Amateur Championship
 
Source:

Team appearances
Amateur
European Young Masters (representing Italy): 2011, 2012 (winners)
European Girls' Team Championship (representing Italy): 2011, 2012, 2013, 2014
European Ladies' Team Championship (representing Italy): 2015, 2018
Junior Solheim Cup (representing Europe): 2013
Junior Ryder Cup (representing Europe): 2014
Espirito Santo Trophy (representing Europe): 2014
Youth Olympic Games (representing Italy): 2014
Vagliano Trophy (representing Europe): 2017 (winners)

Source:

References

External links

Italian female golfers
Ladies European Tour golfers
Duke Blue Devils women's golfers
Golfers at the 2014 Summer Youth Olympics
Sportspeople from Milan
1996 births
Living people